"O Come to the Altar" is a song by American worship group Elevation Worship. It was released on February 24, 2017, as the lead single from their fifth live album, Here as in Heaven (2016). The song was written by Chris Brown, Mack Brock, Steven Furtick, and Wade Joye. The song peaked at No. 2 on the Hot Christian Songs chart, their highest-charting entry. It stayed there for a record total of sixteen weeks, blocked by Lecrae's "I'll Find You" and Hillsong Worship's "What a Beautiful Name".

Track listing

Charts

Weekly charts

Year-end charts

Decade-end charts

Release history

Certifications

References

2015 songs
2017 singles
Elevation Worship songs
Songs written by Steven Furtick